The Statute of Westminster of 1275 (3 Edw. I), also known as the Statute of Westminster I, codified the existing law in England, into 51 chapters. Only Chapter 5 (which mandates free elections) is still in force in the United Kingdom, whilst part of Chapter 1 remains in force in New Zealand. It was repealed in Ireland in 1983.

William Stubbs gives a summary of the Statute:

History
The Statute of Westminster of 1275 was one of two English statutes largely drafted by Robert Burnell and passed during the reign of Edward I. Edward I had returned from the Ninth Crusade on 2 August 1274 and was crowned King of England on 19 August. His first Parliament was summoned for the quinzaine of the Purification on 16 February 1275 but was prorogued until the day after Easter on 22 April 1275, but did not meet until the week commencing 29 April or, according to Chronicle records, until the beginning of May, for unknown reasons. It met at Westminster, its main work being the consideration of the Statute of Westminster I, the agreement of new levies in Ireland and allowing the King to levy a new tax on wool. This was drawn up, not in Latin, but in Norman French, and was passed "by the assent of Archbishops, Bishops, Abbots, Priors, Earls, Barons, and [all] the Commonalty of the Realm, being thither summoned."

Chapters
The Statute of Westminster I is composed of 51 chapters:

Ireland
In the early history of the Lordship of Ireland, English statutes were often applied to Ireland. A 1285 writ authorised Stephen de Fulbourn, then Justiciar of Ireland, to apply there English statutes including Westminster I, Westminster II, Gloucester, and those of merchants. A 1320 act of the Parliament of Ireland (13 Edw. 2 c.2) readopted all these statutes. An act of Edward Poynings' 1495 session of the Parliament of Ireland adopted statutes "formerly made for the common weal" in England; later the Maintenance and Embracery Act 1634 adopted all English statutes dealing with champerty and maintenance and embracery. Many chapters of the 1275 English statute were repealed with respect to Ireland by the Statute Law (Ireland) Revision Act 1872. In the Republic of Ireland, the Short Titles Act 1962 assigned the short title "Distress Act 1275" to chapter 16 of the 1275 English statute, as adopted under the 1495 Irish act; and the short title "Maintenance and Champerty Act 1275" to chapters 25 and 28 of the 1275 English statute, as adopted under the 1634 Irish act. The Statute Law Revision Act 1983 repealed the whole of the 1275 English statute and the 1285 and 1320 Irish statutes.

See also 
 Statute of Westminster 1285
 Quia Emptores of 1290 is sometimes called the statute of Westminster III

References

Notes

Sources

 - Chapter 5 of the Statute

Additional reading
 

1275 in England
1270s in law
13th century in England
Acts of the Parliament of England
Acts of the Parliament of England still in force
History of the City of Westminster
Medieval English law